Heat is energy in transfer to or from a thermodynamic system by mechanisms other than thermodynamic work or transfer of matter.

Heat or HEAT may also refer to:

Science and technology
 Heat wave, a period of excessively hot weather
 HEAT repeat, a solenoid protein domain found in a number of cytoplasmic proteins
 Heat, in metallurgy, one batch of molten metal processed in a converter or open hearth furnace
 High Elevation Auger Telescope, at the Pierre Auger Observatory, Argentina

Medicine
 Fever, a body temperature above the normal range in response to internal physiological conditions
 Heat illness, a spectrum of disorders due to environmental exposure to heat:
 Heat cramps, muscle spasms that result from loss of large amount of salt and water through exercise
 Heat edema, swelling of the hands and/or feet due to over-expansion of the blood vessels in the extremities in response to heat
 Heat exhaustion, caused by the loss of water and electrolytes through sweating
 Heat rash, skin irritations caused by excessive sweating or blocked sweat glands
 Heat stroke, with a body temperature greater than 
 Heat syncope, fainting or dizziness as a result of overheating
 Heat tetany, cramps and seizures caused by calcium and/or magnesium loss due to excessive sweating in short periods of stress in high heat
 Hyperthermia, elevated body temperature due to failed thermoregulation that occurs when a body produces or absorbs more heat than it dissipates
 Malignant hyperthermia, a type of severe reaction that may occur to susceptible patients during general anesthesia
 Hot flash or hot flush, a feeling of heat, with sweating and increased heart rate, usually experienced by menopausal women due to low estradiol

Computing
 HEAT (software), help desk software by FrontRange Solutions
 OpenStack Heat, the orchestration component of the OpenStack infrastructure-as-a-service software platform

Arts, entertainment and media

Games
 Need for Speed: Heat

Films
 Heat (1963 film), a Soviet drama film directed by Larisa Shepitko
 Heat (1972 film), an American drama film directed by Paul Morrissey, starring Sylvia Miles and Joe Dallesandro
 Heat (1986 film), an American action-thriller film directed by Dick Richards and Jerry Jameson, starring Burt Reynolds 
 Heat (1995 film), an American crime drama directed by Michael Mann, starring Al Pacino, Robert De Niro and Val Kilmer
 Natural Justice: Heat (1996), an Australian television film, sometimes referred to as Heat, directed by Scott Hartford-Davis
 Heat (2006 film), a Russian comedy film directed Rezo Gigineishvili
 The Heat (film), a 2013 comedy film directed by Paul Feig, starring Sandra Bullock and Melissa McCarthy

Literature
 Heat (Buffy/Angel novel), a 2004 original novel based on the television series Buffy the Vampire Slayer and Angel
 Heat (Goldman novel), a 1985 novel by William Goldman
 Heat (Lupica novel), a 2006 sports novel written by Mike Lupica
 Heat, a 2006 book on climate change by George Monbiot
 Heat, a 2006 book on cooking and food by Bill Buford
 Heat & Other Stories, a 1991 collection by Joyce Carol Oates
 Heat, a 1994 novel by Stuart Woods
 Heat (manga), a 1999 manga written by Yoshiyuki Okamura

Fictional characters
 Heat, a character in the Bust a Groove and Bust a Groove 2 video games
 Heat, a protagonist in the Digital Devil Saga video game series

Music
 H.E.A.T (band), a Swedish rock band

Albums
 Heat (Colder album), 2005
 Heat (Jimmy Barnes album)
 Heat (Soul for Real album), 1999
 Heat (soundtrack), score for the 1995 film Heat
 The Heat (Toni Braxton album), 2000

EPs
 Heat (EP), by Beyoncé Knowles
 Heat EP: All Pain Is Beat, by Combichrist

Songs
 "Heat" (50 Cent song)
 "Heat" (Chris Brown song)
 "Heat" (Kelly Clarkson song)
 "Heat" (Kim Hyun-joong song)
 "Heat", a song by Brockhampton from Saturation
 "Heat", a song by David Bowie from The Next Day
 "Heat", a song by Eminem from Revival
 "Heat", a song by Loona from + +
 "HEAT", a song by Tigers Jaw from Tigers Jaw

Periodicals
 Heat (magazine), a British magazine
 HEAT (magazine), an international Australian literary magazine

Television
 Heat (TV channel), a British television channel
 Heat (TV series), an Irish prime time reality television series broadcast on RTÉ One
 "Heat" (Dark Angel), an episode of the television series Dark Angel

Food
 Pungency or piquantness ("Heat" or "hotness"), the spiciness of foods such as black pepper, chili peppers, garlic and onions, ginger, mustard, and horseradish
 Heat, the traditional and most common means of cooking food
 Heat, applied post-preparation to food with a heat lamp, to prevent the growth of microorganisms before the food is consumed

Military and law enforcement
 Firearm (slang: heat), usually a pistol
 High-explosive anti-tank, a warhead with a shaped charge
 Heat, slang for police surveillance or attention

Sports
 Heat, a preliminary race or match in a sports tournament
 Fastball (colloquialism: heat), in baseball

Wrestling
 Heat (professional wrestling), applause or booing given by fans to a professional wrestler
 ECW Heat Wave, a professional wrestling pay-per-view event
 WWE Heat, a professional wrestling television program
 Heat (wrestler), ring name of Japanese professional wrestler Minoru Tanaka

Teams
 Abbotsford Heat, an ice hockey team that plays in the AHL
 Brisbane Heat, a Big Bash cricket team
 Laredo Heat, a United Soccer Leagues Premier Development League soccer team

Basketball
 Guildford Heat, a British Basketball League team
 Kurasini Heat, a Tanzanian basketball team
 Miami Heat, a National Basketball Association team
 Saigon Heat, a Vietnamese team

Other uses
 Heat (perfume), or Beyoncé Heat, a women's cologne endorsed by singer Beyoncé Knowles
 Heat, one of the eight principles in Chinese medicine

See also
 Thermoception, the sensation and perception of temperature or temperature differences
 Heat flux, a flow of energy per unit of area per unit of time
 Calorie (Latin: : heat), the amount of heat needed to raise the temperature of a quantity of water by one degree Celsius
 "On heat", the estrus stage (a period of increased sexual drive) in the estrous cycle of mammals 
 Hīt, Iraq (pronounced "heat")
 The Heat (disambiguation)
 Hot (disambiguation)
 Temperature (disambiguation)